Stop at Nothing is the fourth album by American technical death metal band Dying Fetus. The album, like its predecessor Destroy the Opposition, was produced by the band and Steve Carr.

Shortly after the release of Destroy the Opposition, all of the band except for John Gallagher quit. Gallagher  brought in new vocalist Vince Matthews, guitarist Mike Kimball, bass guitarist Sean Beasley and drummer Eric Seyanga.

The black and white part of the cover of the album is part of a photograph taken by Lewis Wickes Hine, the American sociologist and photographer, called "Power house mechanic working on steam pump". The steam pump has been shown in color while the original photo was completely black and white.

A video was produced for the song "One Shot, One Kill".

Two tracks from the album were used in Viva La Bam, "Schematics" in the second-season episode "Tree Top Casino" and  "Forced Elimination" in the third-season episode "Angry Ape".

Track listing

Personnel
  Vince Matthews - lead vocals
 John Gallagher -  guitars, co-lead vocals
 Mike Kimball - guitars
 Sean Beasley - bass
 Erik Sayenga - drums

References 

Dying Fetus albums
2003 albums
Relapse Records albums